Pick of the Week is a Canadian anthology television series which aired on CBC Television from 1967 to 1969.

Premise
Selected episodes of CBC's prime time series were rebroadcast in this weekday morning time slot such as Man Alive, Newsmagazine, The Public Eye, Singalong Jubilee and This Land. Sometimes a National Film Board of Canada production would be broadcast. The series sometimes gave national exposure to a local program such as CBC Winnipeg's Death Of A Nobody which presented First Nations concerns.

Scheduling
This half-hour series was broadcast weekdays at 11:25 a.m. from 16 October 1967 to 29 September 1969.

References

External links
 

CBC Television original programming
1967 Canadian television series debuts
1969 Canadian television series endings